The Chinese minnow (Rhynchocypris oxycephalus) is an Asian species of small freshwater cyprinid fish. It is found from the Amur rivers in the north to the Yangtze in China in the south.

References

Rhynchocypris
Freshwater fish of China
Fish of Russia
Fish described in 1874